Warsaw Ochota is a railway station in Warsaw, Poland, located in the district of Ochota at Plac Zawiszy on the corner of Aleje Jerozolimskie and Towarowa Street. The station lies in a cutting. It has two island platforms, one on the suburban tracks of the Warsaw Cross-City Line for the regional trains run by Koleje Mazowieckie and Szybka Kolej Miejska and one for the Warszawska Kolej Dojazdowa light railway. The station building, at the street level, was constructed in 1963: it has a saddle roof in a distinct shape of a hyperbolic paraboloid. It was including escalator then. The location allows for convenient interchange with city trams and buses serving the western part of the city centre.

References

External links
 

Railway stations in Poland opened in 1962
Ochota
Railway stations served by Koleje Mazowieckie
Railway stations served by Szybka Kolej Miejska (Warsaw)
Railway stations served by Warszawska Kolej Dojazdowa
Ochota